The Shivabhai Jerambhai Gohil is an Indian politician, social worker and member of Gujarat Legislative Assembly as a member of Bhartiya Janata Party and in 2022 election, Gohil defeated the Kanubhai Kalsariya of Indian National Congress party by 30,472 votes. in 2014, Gohil won bypoll election and succeeded Bharti Shiyal.

References 

Living people
Bharatiya Janata Party politicians from Gujarat
Gujarat MLAs 2002–2007
People from Bhavnagar district
Gujarat MLAs 2012–2017
Gujarat MLAs 2022–2027
1958 births